Kenneth James Dyer (March 16, 1946 – March 7, 2010) was an American football player who played two seasons with the Cincinnati Bengals of the National Football League. He was drafted by the San Diego Chargers in the fourth round of the 1968 NFL Draft. He played college football at Arizona State University and attended Ann Arbor High School in Ann Arbor, Michigan. Dyer broke his neck while attempting to tackle Green Bay Packers running back John Brockington on October 3, 1971, ending his playing career. He died of heart failure on March 7, 2010.

References

External links
Just Sports Stats

1946 births
2010 deaths
Players of American football from Ann Arbor, Michigan
American football defensive backs
American football wide receivers
Arizona State Sun Devils football players
San Diego Chargers players
Cincinnati Bengals players